Scent hounds (or scenthounds) are a type of hound that primarily hunts by scent rather than sight. These breeds are hunting dogs and are generally regarded as having some of the most sensitive noses among dogs. Scent hounds specialize in following scent or smells. Most of them tend to have long, drooping ears and large nasal cavities to enhance smell sensitivity. They need to have relatively high endurance to be able to keep track of scent over long distances and rough terrain. It is believed that they were originally bred by the Celts.

Description 
Hounds are hunting dogs that either hunt by following the scent of a game animal (scent hounds) or by following the animal by sight (sighthounds). There are many breeds in the scent hound type, and scent hounds may do other work as well, so exactly which breeds should be called scent hound can be controversial. Kennel clubs assign breeds of dogs to Groups, which are loosely based on breed types. Each kennel club determines which breeds it will place in a given group.

Scent hounds specialize in following a smell or scent. Most of these breeds have long, drooping ears. One theory says that this trait helps to collect scent from the air and keep it near the dog's face and nose. They also have large nasal cavities, which helps them scent better. Their typically loose, moist lips are said to assist in trapping scent particles.

Because scent hounds tend to walk or run with their noses to the ground, many scent hound breeds have been developed such that the dog will hold their tail upright when on a scent. In addition, some breeds (e.g. beagle) also have been bred to have white hair on the tip of their tails. These traits allow the dog's master to identify him when at a distance or in longer grassland.

Scent hounds do not need to be as fast as sighthounds, because they do not need to keep prey in sight, but they need endurance so that they can stick with a scent and follow it for long distances over rough terrain. The best scent hounds can follow a scent trail even across running water and even when it is several days old. Most scent hounds are used for hunting in packs of multiple dogs. Longer-legged hounds run more quickly and usually require that the hunters follow on horseback; shorter-legged hounds allow hunters to follow on foot. Hunting with some breeds, such as German Bracke, American Foxhounds, or coonhounds, involves allowing the pack of dogs to run freely while the hunters wait in a fixed spot until the dogs' baying announces that the game has been "treed". The hunters then go to the spot on foot, following the sound of the dogs' baying.

Vocalization
Most scent hounds have a range of vocalizations, which can vary depending upon the situation the dog finds himself in. Their baying voice - most often used when excited and is useful in informing their master that they are following a scent trail - is deep and booming and can be distinct from their barking voice; which itself can have variations in tone from excited to nervous or fearful.

As they are bred to 'give voice' when excited, scent hounds may bark much more frequently than other dog breeds. Although this can be a nuisance in settled areas, it is a valuable trait that allows the dog's handler to follow the dog or pack of dogs during a hunt even when they are out of sight, such as when following a fox or raccoon through woodland

Classification 
The Fédération Cynologique Internationale (FCI) places scent hounds into their classification "Group 6". This includes a subdivision, "Section 2, Leash Hounds", some examples of which are the Bavarian Mountain Hound (Bayrischer Gebirgsschweisshund, no. 217), the Hanover Hound (Hannover'scher Schweisshund, no. 213), and the Alpine Dachsbracke (Alpenländische Dachsbracke, no. 254). In addition, the Dalmatian and the Rhodesian Ridgeback are placed in Group 6 as "Related breeds".

Genetic history 
Genetic studies indicate that the scent hounds are more closely related to each other than they are with other branches on the dog family tree.

Breeds 
The scent hound type includes the following breeds:

Alpine Dachsbracke
American Leopard Hound
Anglo-French hounds (French hounds crossed with English Foxhounds)
Anglo-Français de Petite Vénerie
Grand Anglo-Français Blanc et Noir
Grand Anglo-Français Blanc et Orange
Grand Anglo-Français Tricolore
Ariegeois
Artois Hound
Austrian Black and Tan Hound
Basset Artésien Normand
Basset Bleu de Gascogne
Basset Fauve de Bretagne
Basset Hound
Bavarian Mountain Hound
Beagle
Beagle-Harrier
Billy
Black Mouth Cur
Bloodhound
Blue Lacy
Bosnian Broken-haired Hound
Briquet Griffon Vendéen
Catahoula Leopard Dog
Coonhounds
Black and Tan Coonhound
Bluetick Coonhound
English Coonhound (a.k.a. American English Coonhound and Redtick Coonhound)
Redbone Coonhound
Treeing Walker Coonhound
Cretan Hound
Dachshund
Deutsche Bracke
Drever (Swedish Dachsbracke)
Dunker (Norwegian Hound)
Estonian Hound
Finnish Hound
Foxhounds
American Foxhound
English Foxhound
Dumfriesshire Black and Tan Foxhound (extinct)
Welsh Foxhound
French hounds
Chien Français Blanc et Noir
Chien Français Blanc et Orange
Chien Français Tricolore
Grand Basset Griffon Vendéen
Grand Bleu de Gascogne
Grand Gascon Saintongeois
Grand Griffon Vendéen
Greek Harehound
Griffon Bleu de Gascogne
Griffon Fauve de Bretagne
Hamiltonstövare
Hanover Hound
Harrier
Istrian Coarse-haired Hound
Istrian Shorthaired Hound
Kerry Beagle
Limer (obsolete term)
Montenegrin Mountain Hound
Mountain Cur
North Country Beagle (Northern Hound) (extinct)
Otterhound
Petit Basset Griffon Vendéen
Petit Bleu de Gascogne
Petit Gascon Saintongeois
Plott Hound
Polish Hound (pl. Ogar Polski)
Polish Hunting Dog (pl. Gończy Polski)
Porcelaine
Posavac Hound
Rache (obsolete term)
Sabueso Español (Spanish Scenthound)
Sabueso fino Colombiano
St. Hubert Jura Hound
Schillerstövare
Segugio dell'Appennino
Segugio Italiano a pelo forte
Segugio Italiano a pelo raso
Segugio Maremmano
Serbian Hound
Serbian Tricolour Hound
Schweizer Laufhund
Schweizerischer Niederlaufhund
Slovenský Kopov (Slovakian Hound)
Smalandstövare
Southern Hound (extinct)
Stephens Cur
Styrian Coarse-haired Hound
Talbot Hound (extinct)
Transylvanian Hound
Treeing Cur
Treeing Tennessee Brindle
Trigg Hound
Tyrolean Hound
Westphalian Dachsbracke

United Kennel Club (US) Scenthound Group 
The  Scenthound Group is the group category used by the United Kennel Club (US), which it divides into two categories. The first includes the American hunting dogs known as coonhounds and the European hounds from which they were developed. These are referred to as Tree Hounds. The category also includes curs, American dogs bred for hunting a variety of game, such as squirrels, raccoons, opossums, bobcats, cougars, American black bears and feral pigs. The second category is referred to as Trailing Scenthounds, and includes dogs used for tracking of humans, reputedly descended from the St. Hubert Hounds (the ancestor of today's Bloodhound) kept by monks in Belgium.

See also 

Dog type
Hound
Hunting dog
Sighthound

References 

 
Hunting
Hunting with hounds
Dog shows and showing